Toon Tunz is the seventh studio album by Italian artist Giorgio Vanni, released on 10 May 2019 via Lova Music.

Background 
Album production was revealed on 14 January 2019 in an Instagram story on the artist's profile. Various songs of the tracklist were confirmed in that story. The following day in a radio interwiev at Radiobicocca, Gormiti un'altra avventura and Gormiti, the Legend is Back were confirmed in the tracklist but the first one at the release of the album wasn't into album tracklist. Then, during the presentation of the 45 vinyl of Dragon Ball Super Kame Hame Ha, Giorgio confirmed the release date for the album on 26 April but that date was only for the participants of Napoli Comicon 2019.

The album 
On 10 May 2019, the artist publishes some teaser trailer of the cover of the album that sees Giorgio Vanni on a throne. The album has all the singles from Pokémon Go to Dragon Ball Super Kame Hame Ha (Remix), some of the cartoons themes written in the previous years, an unpublished new song that takes the name from the title of the album. There's also Yu-Gi-Oh GX, a song of 2006 that was published only in some RTI Music's compilation.

The first pages of the booklet are full of photos took from Giorgio Vanni's lives and a message from him. There's also a two-pages photo of Giorgio Vanni and Max Longhi and the credits of the songs at the end of the booklet. Some of the titles of the songs have been a bit changed from their registration into SIAE and their single version as well
. That happened for Dragon Ball Super Kame Hame Ha, Rubami ancora il cuore and Sole e Luna.

The digital album version has a different tracklist from the CD version with four less songs.

Tracklist 

CD Tracklist

Digital Download

Album production 

 Max Longhi – Executive Producer
 Giorgio Vanni – Executive Producer
 Daniele Cuccione – Music production, assistant and coordinator
 RTI S.p.A. – Executive Producer for Yu-Gi-Oh! GX, Lupin ladro Full-Time and Rubami ancora il cuore
 Movieland – Executive Producer for Movieland luci, camera, azione!
 Danceonline – Executive Producer for Supereroi e Onda dopo onda
 Giochi Preziosi S.p.A. – Executive Producer for Gormiti the Legend is Back
 Mattel – Executive Producer for Mecardimal Go
 Angelo Antonuccio – Studio Photos and Artwork
 Roby Manini – Layout
 Pietro Caramelli – Mastering at Energymaster (Milano)

Charts

References

External links

Electronic dance music albums by Italian artists
Pop albums by Italian artists
2019 albums